Dino Šarac (born 6 September 1990) is a Serbian football midfielder who plays for Rad.

Career
After maturing in FK Novi Sad youth ranks, Šarac had two loan spells in Bačka from Bačka Palanka and Metalac Futog (both Serbian 3rd tier clubs). A year later he moved to second division team ČSK Čelarevo, then to Srem in the same league. In summer 2011 he joined  Serbian SuperLiga club Spartak Subotica.

On 22 August 2019 FK Hajduk Kula confirmed the signing of Šarac.

References

External links
 
 Dino Šarac Stats at utakmica.rs

1990 births
Footballers from Novi Sad
Living people
Association football midfielders
Serbian footballers
OFK Bačka players
FK ČSK Čelarevo players
FK Srem players
FK Spartak Subotica players
FK Donji Srem players
FK Novi Pazar players
FK Napredak Kruševac players
FK Metalac Gornji Milanovac players
FK Hajduk Kula players
FK Sloga Kraljevo players
FK Rad players
Serbian First League players
Serbian SuperLiga players